Geneviève Dorion-Coupal is a dancer, choreographer and artistic director native of Quebec, Canada. She has contributed to musicals, shows, theatre plays, and television programs. She has also made diverse incursions into the cinema and advertising.

Musical and theatrical plays 
She was part of the artistic direction of The Man in Black, a musical tribute to Johnny Cash, that was primarily presented at the Capitol de Québec and that toured Canada afterwards. She is also the choreographer of Love, a production of the Cirque du Soleil, inspired by the work of The Beatles, but also of Les Misérables, Generation Motown, Night Fever, Dalida and Chicago.

Special events
She was in charge of the Québécois show at the Opening Night of the Vancouver Winter Olympics 2010.

Broadcast television
The public has seen her work in the Québécois reality show Star Académie and on the Polish version of the show So You Think You Can Dance.

References

External links
 Official website

Canadian contemporary dancers
Canadian female dancers
Canadian choreographers
French Quebecers
Living people
Year of birth missing (living people)
You Can Dance: Po prostu tańcz!
Canadian women choreographers